María de la Paloma Villaseñor Vargas (born 23 November 1960) is a Mexican politician affiliated with the PRI. As of 2013 she served as Deputy of the LXII Legislature of the Mexican Congress representing the Federal District.

References

1960 births
Living people
People from Mexico City
Women members of the Chamber of Deputies (Mexico)
Institutional Revolutionary Party politicians
21st-century Mexican politicians
21st-century Mexican women politicians
Deputies of the LXII Legislature of Mexico
Members of the Chamber of Deputies (Mexico) for Mexico City